Edward Corrie and Daniel Smethurst were the defending champions, having won the event in 2014 in Rimouski, but Smethurst decided not to participate this year. Corrie partnered with Alex Kuznetsov, but lost in the semifinals to Philip Bester and Chris Guccione.

Bester and Guccione won the title, defeating Frank Dancevic and Frank Moser 6–4, 7–6(8–6) in the final.

Seeds

Draw

References
Main Draw

Challenger Banque Nationale de Drummondville
Challenger de Drummondville